Marius Sandu Iordache (born 8 October 1978 in Craiova, Dolj County, Romania) is a retired Romanian football player. He played as a left back.

External links
 

1978 births
Living people
Romanian footballers
Romania under-21 international footballers
Romanian expatriate footballers
Romanian expatriate sportspeople in Spain
Sportspeople from Craiova
FC U Craiova 1948 players
Villarreal CF players
FC Steaua București players
FC Progresul București players
Ethnikos Achna FC players
CSM Ceahlăul Piatra Neamț players
CS Pandurii Târgu Jiu players
Expatriate footballers in Cyprus
Liga I players
Cypriot First Division players
Romanian expatriate sportspeople in Cyprus
Association football defenders